Scott Daniel Peterson (born c. 1966) is an American author and journalist. He graduated from Yale University in 1988 with a degree in English and was a member of Manuscript Society in his senior year. He was a Middle East correspondent for the Daily Telegraph. In 2000 he became a staff writer for The Christian Science Monitor, with his first posting as Moscow bureau chief. His first book, Me Against My Brother: At War in Somalia, Sudan and Rwanda (2001), is an account of his experiences and observations during a decade of reporting from Sub-Saharan Africa. His second book, Let the Swords Encircle Me: Iran—A Journey Behind the Headlines (2010), is based on more than thirty extended reporting trips to Iran.

Career summary
After his stint as a Middle East correspondent working on Iran issues for The Christian Science Monitor in Amman, then as Moscow Bureau Chief, Scott Petersen started work as the Bureau Chief in Istanbul. Besides, he also works as a photographer for Getty Images. His work across three continents spanning over two decades, reporting and photographing on "power and conflict" presented in coherent narratives, has made him one of the most experienced and widely traveled foreign correspondent of his time. His extensive travels to Iran, crossing more than 30 times, produced his book, Let the Swords Encircle Me: Iran—A Journey Behind the Headlines (Simon & Schuster, Sept. 2010), based on Iran's politics, history, and culture. The book was awarded as one of the "Best Books of 2010" by Publishers Weekly. 
During his career as a photo-journalist, he has covered, Algiers, Beirut, and the entire Russia and the Central Asia. In 1999, he had to travel with the Taliban in Afghanistan. During his assignment in Iraq at the time of the Kurdish Revolt in 1991, he had to flee the country with more than a million Kurds when the resistance army was defeated at the hands of Saddam Hussein's forces.

In 2002, Scott's work in  Northern Iraq won him  the "Citation of Excellence" award from the Overseas Press Club of America. He also worked for The Daily Telegraph (London) covering the Former Yugoslavia on conflicts in Bosnia, Kosovo, and Serbia.

Personal
Peterson completed his degree in English and East Asian Studies from Yale University. Apart from his work, he is very passionate about rock climbing and encourages his four children in the sport.

Bibliography

Books 
  — reviews:

References

External links

1966 births
Living people
American male journalists
The Christian Science Monitor people
Yale University alumni